Vauxhall and I is the fourth studio album by English alternative rock musician Morrissey. It was released on 14 March 1994, by the record label Parlophone in the UK and Sire/Reprise in the US.

Background 
The album's title may be a reference to the 1987 film Withnail and I. Vauxhall is an area of London noted for its gay clubs, and there is also a British car manufacturer of the same name.

"Spring Heeled Jim" contains bits of dialogue from We Are the Lambeth Boys, a 1959 documentary that follows the lives of members of a south London youth club. The line "Don't leave us in the dark" at the end of "Billy Budd" is sampled from the 1948 David Lean film adaptation of Dickens' Oliver Twist. This was said by one of Fagin's pickpockets to Fagin when the mob was closing in on their hiding place. The song itself shares the title with a novella by Herman Melville.

Release 
Vauxhall and I was a success in the United States, making the top 20. It was also Morrissey's second solo album to reach the top of the charts in Britain, the first being Viva Hate.

The lead single off the album, "The More You Ignore Me, the Closer I Get", became the only song by Morrissey or the Smiths to achieve chart success in the United States, where it reached number 46 on the Billboard Hot 100 and number 1 on the Modern Rock Tracks chart. In the United Kingdom, the song hit number 8 on the UK Singles Chart and was the only single by Morrissey to reach the top ten during the 1990s.

Reception 

Q listed Vauxhall and I as one of the top ten albums of 1994. In February 2006, the same magazine voted it at number 89 on its list of the best albums ever.

Track listing

Definitive Edition, 20th Anniversary Remaster
The 2014 anniversary remaster includes the previously unavailable 1995 concert from Theatre Royal, London.

"Billy Budd" 
"Have-a-Go Merchant" 
"Spring-Heeled Jim" 
"London" 
"You're the One for Me, Fatty" 
"Boxers" 
"Jack the Ripper" 
"We'll Let You Know" 
"Whatever Happens I Love You" 
"Why Don't You Find Out for Yourself" 
"The More You Ignore Me, the Closer I Get" 
"National Front Disco" 
"Moon River" 
"Now My Heart Is Full"

Personnel 
Musicians
 Morrissey – vocals
 Alain Whyte – guitar
 Boz Boorer – guitar
 Jonny Bridgwood – bass
 Woodie Taylor – drums

Technical
 Greg Ross – art direction
 Dean Freeman – photography
 Chris Dickie – producer, engineer
 Steve Lillywhite – producer
 Danton Supple – assistant engineer

Charts

Certifications

References

External links 
 

Morrissey albums
1994 albums
Albums produced by Steve Lillywhite
Sire Records albums